Pandita Tripti Mukherjee is an American classical vocalist. She belongs to Mewati Gharana. She is the founder and director of the Pandit Jasraj Institute for Music, Research, Artistry and Appreciation.

Early life
Tripti Mukherjee is a senior disciple of Padma Vibhushan Pandit Jasraj.

Career
Tripti Mukherjee and her commitment over the past 20 years to spreading India's rich culture and heritage in their purest forms throughout America.

Pta Triptiji has received great recognition for her stellar performances at a multitude of locations across the world. She is a regular artiste for All India Radio and national Indian Television. Some of her prominent performances across the globe are mentioned below:

 Diwali Festival (2007) at White House, Washington, DC
 Jewels of India Concert Series at the Indian Consulate in New York, NY
 Symphony Space in New York, NY
 Wortham Theatre Center in Houston, TX
 Annual Pandit Motiram Pandit Maniram Sangeet Samaroh in Hyderabad 
 Hari Vallabh Sangeet Samaroh in Jalandhar
 Sawai Gandharva Music Festival in Pune 
 Dover Lane music festival in Kolkata
 Community college theatres in Hayward, CA and Northampton, PA

Awards 
Pta Tripti Mukherjee is the recipient of several awards including:
 Chhandayan Jyotsna Award 
 Amir Khan Memorial Award 
 Pandit Jasraj Gaurav Puraskar 
 Pandita award from the University of Karnataka
 National Scholarship for Hindustani Classical Vocal
 Doverlane Music Circle Award
 Yugantar Patrika Award

She was awarded Padma Shri, the fourth highest civilian award of India, in 2015.

References

External links
 Interview with Dileepsri

Hindustani singers
Living people
Mewati gharana
Recipients of the Padma Shri in arts
Women Hindustani musicians
American women singers of Indian descent
American classical musicians of Indian descent
American people of Bengali descent
American classical musicians
Expatriate musicians in India
American expatriates in India
20th-century American singers
21st-century American singers
Year of birth missing (living people)
20th-century American women singers
21st-century American women singers